Edina Balogh (born July 14, 1984 in Budapest, Hungary) Hungarian actress, model, and beauty queen.

Career 
She won Miss Hungary in 2003. She has been an actress since 2004. She was chosen as a character of the Hungarian soap opera Barátok közt (Among Friends). She has the role of Kinga Nádor. She was awarded with Zenthe Award in 2008 as the prettiest actress.

External links 
  Sztárlexikon (Lexcon of Stars)
  Sztárlexikon (Leicon of Stars)

1984 births
Living people
Hungarian television actresses
Hungarian beauty pageant winners